The Inevitable is the first album by the Squirrel Nut Zippers, released in 1995.

Track listing
 "Lover's Lane" (Jimbo Mathus)  – 3:03
 "Danny Diamond" (Ken Mosher)  – 3:49
 "I've Found a New Baby" (Jack Palmer, Spencer Williams)  – 2:42
 "Anything But Love" (Don Raleigh)  – 2:38
 "Good Enough for Granddad" (Mathus, Raleigh)  – 2:17
 "Wished for You" (Mathus)  – 2:14
 "La Grippe" (Mathus)  – 3:10
 "Lugubrious Whing Whang" (Mathus)  – 2:38
 "Club Limbo" (Tom Maxwell)  – 2:56
 "Wash Jones" (Mathus)  – 3:04
 "You're Driving Me Crazy" (Walter Donaldson)  – 2:46
 "Plenty More" (Maxwell)  – 3:27

Personnel
 Jimbo Mathus – guitar, vocals
 Katharine Whalen – banjo, vocals
 Tom Maxwell – guitar, percussion, vocals
 Ken Mosher – guitar, alto and baritone saxophone, vocals
 Stacy Guess – trumpet
 John Kempannin – violin
 Don Raleigh – bass
 Chris Phillips – drums, percussion
 Steve Balcom – executive producer
 Jay Faires – executive producer
 Brian Paulson – engineer, mixing, producer

References

1995 debut albums
Squirrel Nut Zippers albums
Albums produced by Brian Paulson
Mammoth Records albums